Greek National Road 54 (EO54) is a National Road in Greater Athens and Athens metropolitan area in Attica, Greece.

Route

According to the Government Gazette in 1963, the EO54 runs from central Athens to Rafina, via Stavros (near Gerakas).

The route currently has connections with:
 The EO1 and EO91 at Syntagma Square
 Both ends of the EO83 at Ampelokipoi and Rafina
 The EO89 at Stavros (Gerakas)
 The EO87 and the A6 at separate junctions at Pallini.
 The EO85 at Rafina

References

54
Roads in Attica